Darshan Singh Kular (born 15 April 1938 in Sansarpur, Punjab) is a former Indian field hockey player who now lives in Telford, United Kingdom. In 1961, he played for India in the international hockey tournament at Ahemdabad and scored 22 goals. In the semi final, he scored a double hat-trick against Holland. He was part of the Indian Hockey team that won the gold medal in the 1964 Summer Olympics at Tokyo, Japan.

References

External links

Field hockey players from Punjab, India
Olympic field hockey players of India
Olympic gold medalists for India
Field hockey players at the 1964 Summer Olympics
Indian male field hockey players
People from Telford
Living people
Olympic medalists in field hockey
1938 births
Asian Games medalists in field hockey
Field hockey players at the 1962 Asian Games
Medalists at the 1964 Summer Olympics
Asian Games silver medalists for India
Medalists at the 1962 Asian Games